The Olympic soil series is a type of deep, dark reddish brown moderately fine-textured soil which has developed on mafic rock such as basalt. The series covers large areas in southwestern Washington and western Oregon, and usually supports luxuriant forests of Douglas-fir, red alder, western redcedar, western hemlock, and bigleaf maple.

References

External links
Olympic soil landscape at McCleary, Washington as seen in Google Street View

Pedology
Soil in the United States